Malaya Ashinka (Kese Aşinka) is a rural locality (a village) in Krasnovoskhodsky Selsoviet, Iglinsky District, Bashkortostan, Russia. The population was 2 as of 2010. There is 1 street.

Geography 
Malaya Ashinka is located 68 km northeast of Iglino (the district's administrative centre) by road.

References 

Rural localities in Iglinsky District